Vasile Silvian Ciupercă (14 July 1949 – 31 July 2022) was a Romanian politician. A member of the Social Democratic Party, he served in the Chamber of Deputies from 2001 to 2004.

Born in Buzău, he later moved with his family to the town of Țăndărei, in Ialomița County. He went to elementary school and high school in Țăndărei, completing his secondary education in Breaza in 1967. From 1973 he studied at the Faculty of Mathematics of the University of Bucharest, graduating in 1977. He taught at the Țăndărei high school from 1978 to 1996, after which he served as the town's mayor until 2000. After serving in the Chamber of Deputies from 2001 to 2004, he was from 2004 to February 2015 president of the Ialomița County council. On February 10, 2015, he was arrested by the National Anticorruption Directorate on corruption charges. Kept under arrest for 66 days, he was released and sent to trial in June 2015; in May 2017 he was acquitted. 

Ciupercă died on 31 July 2022, at the age of 73, while on vacation with relatives in Vâlcea County; he was buried at the Țăndărei Cemetery.

References

1949 births
2022 deaths
People from Buzău
University of Bucharest alumni
Romanian schoolteachers
Mayors of places in Romania
21st-century Romanian politicians
Social Democratic Party (Romania) politicians
Members of the Chamber of Deputies (Romania)